George Walden is an American former Negro league outfielder who played in the 1940s.

Walden played for the New York Cubans in 1948. In seven recorded games, he posted three hits in 28 plate appearances.

References

External links
 and Seamheads

Year of birth missing
Place of birth missing
New York Cubans players
Baseball outfielders